Jacopo da Lanciano (15th century) was an Italian painter known by a single signed work, a Madonna and Child now in the Museo diocesano di Lanciano, province of Chieti, region of Abruzzo. The painter appears to have been influenced by Paolo Veneziano.

References

Year of birth unknown
Year of death unknown
People from the Province of Chieti
15th-century Italian painters
Italian male painters